The Eureka Springs Cemetery is a historic cemetery located at the junction of County Road 205 and United States Route 62 in Eureka Springs, Arkansas. It was founded in 1889 by the local chapter of the International Order of Odd Fellows (IOOF), which managed it until 1965, when it was acquired by the city. The land was originally owned by the Lamar family, which used it as a family cemetery at least as early as 1880.

The cemetery was listed on the National Register of Historic Places in 2018.

It is the resting place of US Congressman Claude A. Fuller (1876–1968).

See also
 National Register of Historic Places listings in Carroll County, Arkansas

References

External links
 

Cemeteries on the National Register of Historic Places in Arkansas
Buildings and structures in Carroll County, Arkansas
National Register of Historic Places in Carroll County, Arkansas
Odd Fellows cemeteries in the United States
Cemeteries established in the 1880s
1889 establishments in Arkansas